Suraj may refer to:

People

Arts and entertainment
Suraj Jagan, Indian playback singer
Suraj Mani, Indian musical artist
Suraj Sharma (born 1993), Indian actor
Suraj Singh Thakuri, Nepali presenter, director and producer
Suraj Venjaramoodu (born 1976), Malayalam film actor and mimicry artist
Suraj (director), Indian director

Sport
Suraj Lata Devi (born 1981), former captain of the India women's national hockey team
Suraj Narredu (born 1985), Indian jockey
Suraj Randiv (born 1985), Sri Lankan international cricketer
Suraj Singh (footballer) (active from 2014), Indian footballer
Sodiq Suraj (born 1988), Nigerian football player who currently plays for Prime F.C.

Other fields
Suraj Bhan (born 1928), Indian politician
Suraj Bhan (archaeologist) (1931—2010), Indian archaeologist
Suraj N. Gupta (born 1924), Indian-born American theoretical physicist
Surajmal Jat (1707–1763), ruler of Bharatpur, Rajasthan, India
Suraj Singh (1571–1619), ruler of Jodhpur-Marwar

Other uses
Suraj (film), a 1966 Bollywood film starring Rajendra Kumar and Vyjayanthimala
Suraj, Oman, a village in Muscat, Oman

See also
 

Hindu given names